Battle of Sauce was a Uruguayan battle between the Blancos army under the command of Timoteo Aparicio, and the Colorado government troops, under Colonel José Gregorio Suárez. It occurred on the banks of the Arroyo del Sauce, Canelones Department, during the Revolution of the Lances.

History 
This bloody battle fought on May 25, 1870 concluded with a victory for the government army of General Suárez, who ordered to mercilessly execute a large number of prisoners of the White Army. Among the government troops was Máximo Santos, future Uruguayan president for the Colorado party.
 
In the ranks of Timoteo Aparicio, toke part prestigious revolutionaries of the Uruguayan National Party, including the veteran Anacleto Medina, and the young man Isabelino Canaveris, a patriot who also participated in the Revolución of 1897.

References 

Sauce
Sauce
History of Uruguay
1870 in Uruguay
Canelones Department